Lyse Abbey or Saint Mary's Abbey, Lyse  is a now-ruined Cistercian monastery in Bjørnafjorden Municipality in Vestland county in south-western Norway.  The name "Lyse" is derived from  Lysefjorden  near which the building stood.  The abbey lies at the southern base of the Lyshornet mountain.

Pre-Reformation
Lyse Abbey was founded in 1146 by Sigurd, Bishop of the Ancient Diocese of Bergen, on farmland that he owned, as the Christianisation of Norway was nearing completion. The first monks were brought from Fountains Abbey in Yorkshire, England. This was the first Cistercian monastery in Norway and was modelled on others built in England and France.

As with all Cistercians, the monks took a vow of poverty. Renouncing all sources of income except from farming, they developed considerable skill in farming operations and management.  Over time, this led to the abbey acquiring many other farms in the area, making it ever more rich and powerful.  In all, the monastery had about 50 other farms in Os with at least as many more in other areas.

After the Reformation
The abbey was dissolved in 1536 when Christian III of Denmark decreed Lutheranism to be the state religion of Norway. The abbey's possessions were confiscated, becoming the property of the king. Soapstone made up much of the building material. Over the next two centuries, the stones of the monastery structures were gradually removed and contributed to buildings such as the Rosenkrantz Tower in Bergen, and Kronborg Castle in Helsingør in Denmark.

The monastery today
The ruins of the buildings were excavated in 1822 and 1838 and restored around 1930.
The ruins are protected as a national monument and archaeological work to preserve and record the site continues. The monastery is a well-visited tourist site with good nature walks nearby. It is common for couples today to be married at the ruins, or at least to have wedding photographs taken there.

See also
 Cistercians
 Religion in Norway
 Evangelical Lutheran Free Church of Norway

References

External links
 Norges klostre i middelalderen: Lyse kloster 
 360° view of the ruins 

Christian monasteries established in the 12th century
Bjørnafjorden
Cistercian monasteries in Norway
Buildings and structures in Vestland
Ruined abbeys and monasteries
Ruins in Norway
Church ruins in Norway
1536 disestablishments in Norway
Monasteries dissolved under the Norwegian Reformation